The EL/M-2090 TERRA is an Israeli ground-based very long range early-warning radar system produced by Elta, a subsidiary of Israel Aerospace Industries IAI. It is composed of 2 radars: the UHF Ultra and the S band SPECTRA. TERRA's performance is achieved through automatic handover and redundancy between the ULTRA and SPECTRA radars, combined with improved target load sharing, Electronic counter-countermeasures (ECCM) and severe-weather resilience. The system can be used for ballistic missiles and space objects detection and tracking at very long ranges.

Both Spectra and Ultra are active electronically scanned array (AESA) radars that are made up of thousands of transmit/receive modules and use gallium nitride technology (GaN) to enhance their efficiency.

See also
 EL/M-2080 Green Pine
 AN/TPY-2
 Science and technology in Israel

References

External links
 TERRA radar system official webpage

Ground radars
Military radars of Israel
Elta products
Missile defense